EA Bright Light (formerly known as EA UK) was a British video game developer founded in 1995 by Electronic Arts. The studio was primarily known for its work on licensed franchises such as the video game adaptation of the Harry Potter series. As of 2019, a subsidiary known as EA UK exists, albeit being a publishing operation.

History
EA UK was founded in Chertsey, England, United Kingdom in 1995 by Electronic Arts. In 2001, Bullfrog Productions was merged into EA UK, making it to inherit franchises such as Populous, Dungeon Keeper, Syndicate, and Theme Park.

Originally focusing on developing original IPs, the studio released several well-received titles such as Zubo, the first EA title exclusive to Nintendo DS, in 2008. However, the title was a commercial failure, forcing the company to amend its policy and shift to develop casual games and games that were aiming for younger audience. In later years, they also worked on licensed franchises, such as the video game adaptation of the Harry Potter series, which generally received mixed reviews from critics. The company also worked on few Hasbro-related board game adaptations, such as Hasbro Family Game Night, which was released in 2008.

EA UK was renamed to EA Bright Light in 2008, with its headquarter moved to Guildford, England, United Kingdom. In 2011, after both the movie and the video game franchise of Harry Potter were ended, Electronic Arts began a consultation process to shut down EA Bright Light so as to "help centralise development on future projects, reduce development costs and will allow for better knowledge and talent sharing within the organization". After their last title, Harry Potter and the Deathly Hallows – Part 2 was released, Electronic Arts silently shut down EA Bright Light by the end of 2011. Most employees from Bright Light joined Criterion Games and Playfish, the remaining 2 subsidiaries of Electronic Arts in UK, while others joined Jagex and Supermassive Games.

Despite EA declaring that Bright Light would revive several IPs from Bullfrog, none of the titles were developed before the company's closure. Before the company's closure, it is known that they were developing a Maxis-related title.

Games developed

References

External links

Electronic Arts
Defunct companies based in Surrey
Video game companies established in 1995
Video game companies disestablished in 2011
British subsidiaries of foreign companies
Video game development companies
Defunct video game companies of the United Kingdom
Companies based in Guildford
1995 establishments in England
2011 disestablishments in England